Garry Chillingworth (born 23 January 1970) is an Australian cricketer. He played three first-class matches for South Australia in 1998/99.

See also
 List of South Australian representative cricketers

References

External links
 

1970 births
Living people
Australian cricketers
South Australia cricketers
Cricketers from Sydney